Oleksandr Luchyk (born 30 March 1994) is a professional Ukrainian football midfielder who plays for German club SV Auersmacher.

Career
Luchyk is product of some youth sportive systems, including the FC Illichivets Mariupol sportive school.

He signed his contract with FC Illichivets Mariupol in the Ukrainian Premier League in February 2015 and returned to this club after half-year absence.

References

External links

1994 births
People from Vyzhnytsia
Sportspeople from Chernivtsi Oblast
Living people
Ukrainian footballers
Ukraine youth international footballers
Association football midfielders
FC Mariupol players
PFC Sumy players
FC Poltava players
MFC Mykolaiv players
FC Kramatorsk players
FC Alians Lypova Dolyna players
SV Auersmacher players
Ukrainian Premier League players
Ukrainian First League players
Ukrainian Second League players
Ukrainian Amateur Football Championship players
Oberliga (football) players
Ukrainian expatriate footballers
Expatriate footballers in Germany
Ukrainian expatriate sportspeople in Germany